Orthione griffenis, or Griffen's isopod, is an isopod parasite present in the waters off East Asia and the West Coast of North America.

Description 
Orthione griffenis is an Epicaridean isopoda parasite that is found on the gill chamber of Upogebia mud shrimp. Female O. griffenis are quite different from their male counterpart. Females have an oblong body, that is typically 6-24mm long with a width of half the length. Males are the smaller sex with a body that resembles more of a cylinder than an oval, 8mm long and 3mm wide. Females have 6 pleons and males have 7. O. griffenis are hatched as larva that attach themselves to copepod, and then metamorphose into a microniscus larva. After that they molt several times until they become cryptonicus larva that then infest mud shrimp.

Distribution 

Orthione griffenis is native to the coasts of Asia. O. griffenis was first recorded on the coast of Willapa Bay, Washington, in 1988. Since then, O. griffenis has established itself from British Columbia, Canada to Baja California, Mexico. They were likely introduced from cargo ships bound from Asia emptying their ballast tanks off the coast of North America.

In 2017 this bopyrid was found in mud shrimp in British Columbia.

Ecology 
After being introduced from Asia, Orthione griffenis have established themselves by infesting the mud shrimp Upogebia pugettensis. O. griffenis typically infests female U. pugettensis rather than male (80% compared to 57%). They attach themselves to the gill chamber, where they suck the host's blood. This causes a metabolic burdening effect that greatly hampers reproductive ability, which has led to a significant decline in U. pugettensis. Hatfield Marine Science Center has found that all documented populations of U. pugettensis are infested with O. griffenis, and mud shrimp populations in 4 of 18 estuaries have gone extinct as of 2008. It has been proposed that Orthione griffenis also induced sex change and male mortality in U. pugettensis. However O. griffenis have been associated with modification of secondary sex characteristics and showed no signs of increasing male mortality.

References 

Isopoda
Crustaceans of the Pacific Ocean
 
Crustaceans described in 2004